Jenks Lake is a lake in the San Bernardino National Forest near Angelus Oaks  in San Bernardino County, California. The lake offers several fish species including bass, catfish, bluegill, and rainbow trout. Trout season usually runs from April to October.

Although the lake is man-made, it receives water diverted from the Santa Ana River via a flume, visible from the popular South Fork Trail.

Area lakes and rivers
 Green Valley Lake
 Big Bear Lake
 Arrowbear Lake
 Santa Ana River

See also
 List of lakes in California

References
 

Lakes of San Bernardino County, California
Lakes of California
Lakes of Southern California